Hadhiyaa is a 1993 Maldivian film directed co-directed by Hussain Shihab and Ibrahim Waheed. Developed by Television Maldives and written by Shihab, the film stars Fathimath Rameeza, Ibrahim Rasheed, Ahmed Sharumeel and Mariyam Waheedha in pivotal roles.

Premise
Shafraz (Ibrahim Rasheed), along with three of his friends, teases Rishfa (Fathimath Rameeza) when she faints after exiting a Biruveri Hohalha. In return, she humiliates him in front of his friends insisting that he is married to an older woman (Sithi Fulhu). To sort their differences, Rishfa requests him to meet her face-to-face and he accidentally drops an exercise weight on his foot hence meets her on a wheelchair. They slowly bond and initiate a romantic relationship. Few days into their relationship, Rishfa senses an incoming danger which Shafraz rebuffs as a baseless fear. Her father, Rauf (Ahmed Sharumeel), a chef turned singer, visits home and reunites fondly with Rishfa. She started having frequent headaches and hence Shafraz and Rauf insist her for a medical check-up, where the doctor examines her to be diagnosed with brain tumor and persists her to undergo a surgery.

Soon after, Shafraz leaves to an atoll island for few days where he meets a teacher, Shaaira (Mariyam Waheedha) and assists her in restoring electricity in the school. As a token of appreciation, Shaaira invites him home and they introduce to each other. Both Shafraz and Rauf were unable to attend Rishfa's birthday celebrations, which worsen her situation. Rishfa decides conceal her medical condition to her father and boyfriend, and to move ahead with the surgical operation at the risk of being handicapped in the event of operation failure. To dampen the aftermath, Rishfa breaks up with Shafraz. However, Rauf gets hold of her medical prescription and realizes the situation and notifies Shafraz of the same. Later, Rishfa gets back with Shafraz and together they plan to reunite long-lost lovers, Rauf and Shaaira who were separated during Rishfa’s childhood as she fears Shaaira intends to replace the place of her birth mother, Shahidha (Lilian Saeed).

Cast 
 Fathimath Rameeza as Rishfa
 Ibrahim Rasheed as Shafraz
 Ahmed Sharumeel as Rauf
 Mariyam Waheedha as Shaaira
 Suha as young Rishfa
 Lilian Saeed as Shahidha; Rishfa's mother (special appearance)
 Hussain Shibau as Shafraz's friend
 Naeem as Naeem; Assistant Manager of the school
 Mariyam Manike
 Sithi Fulhu (special appearance)

Soundtrack

Reception
Upon release, the film received mainly positive reviews from critics where the performance of the actors and the direction was particularly praised by the critics. At the end of its theatrical release, the film was declared a success at box office.

References

Maldivian drama films
1993 films
1993 drama films
Dhivehi-language films